Smogorzewo may refer to the following places:
Smogorzewo, Greater Poland Voivodeship (west-central Poland)
Smogorzewo, Żnin County in Kuyavian-Pomeranian Voivodeship (north-central Poland)
Smogorzewo, Włocławek County in Kuyavian-Pomeranian Voivodeship (north-central Poland)